The Spain national rugby league team represents Spain in the sport of rugby league football, running under the auspices of the Asociación Española de Rugby League.

History
The first international rugby league in Spain was played in the region of Catalonia in 2009, with a Catalonia national rugby league team playing several matches against European nations. However, desiring to represent only Catalonia and not the entirety of Spain, the Catalonia team was denied RLEF membership and disappeared from international competition shortly afterwards.

Rugby league in Spain began once again in 2013, with a national body (Asociación Española de Rugby League) being formed and admitted to the RLEF by the end of that year. The first Spanish domestic competition kicked off in 2013 with clubs based in the Valencian Community, and the national team played its first match on May 25, 2014, defeating Belgium in Brussels. The first captain was Aitor Davila and the first Spanish try at international level was scored by Gonzalo Morro.

2017 Rugby League World Cup

Qualifying

On 9 May 2015, Spain and Latvia kicked off proceedings for the qualifying fixtures for the 2017 Rugby League World Cup qualifying. It was a do or die match with the winner advancing to a qualifying group stage, already containing Malta and Greece, while the other would lose their chance of qualifying for their first ever World Cup. The Spaniards were the better team, winning the match by 20 points which therefore made them advance to the European C qualifying group stage. The team ended up winning the tournament and now advance to the final round robin tournament. In the final phase of qualifying, Spain took on Italy and Ireland, however two losses in those matches saw them miss out in their bid to qualify for their first ever Rugby League World Cup.

Current squad
The 22-man national team squad selected for the first match day of the 2021 Rugby League World Cup European play-off tournament.

Competitive record

Overview
International record for the Spain national team as of 29 September 2022.

Results

2010s

2020s

World Cup

Honours
European Bowl: 2015

See also

References

National rugby league teams
National sports teams of Spain